Claude Jamet (1 August 1929 – 16 April 2021) was a French footballer. He played his entire career for LB Châteauroux, from his junior years to his senior career. He also played for the France national amateur football team. He served as president of LB Châteauroux from 1974 to 1989.

References

1929 births
2021 deaths
French footballers
LB Châteauroux players
France amateur international footballers
French football chairmen and investors
Association football defenders